Like a Conquered Province: The Moral Ambiguity of America is a book of Paul Goodman's Massey Lectures for the Canadian Broadcasting Corporation on topics of American pathologies, in particular, citizens not taking responsibility for the consequences of inequality and harmful technologies. He advocates for decentralized alternatives to existing institutions that give greater control to individuals.

References

Further reading

External links 

 

1967 non-fiction books
American non-fiction books
English-language books
Massey Lectures books
Random House books
Books by Paul Goodman